Swimming is the self-propulsion of a human through water or another liquid, usually for recreation, sport, exercise, or survival. 

Swimming may also refer to:

Movement and sport 
 Aquatic locomotion, animal movement through water 
 Swimming (sport), the competitive sport

Media 
 Swimming (Mac Miller album), a 2018 album
 Swimming (French Kicks album), a 2008 album
 Swimming (The Names album), a 1982 album
 Swimming (band), an art rock band from Nottingham, United Kingdom
 Swimming (film), a 2000 film directed by Robert J. Siegel
 "Swimming", an episode of the television series Zoboomafoo

See also 
 Swim (disambiguation)
 Swimmer (disambiguation)